Lifeforce is a 1985 science fiction horror film directed by Tobe Hooper, adapted by Dan O'Bannon and Don Jakoby, and starring Steve Railsback, Peter Firth, Frank Finlay, Mathilda May, and Patrick Stewart. Based on Colin Wilson's 1976 novel The Space Vampires, the film portrays the events that unfold after a trio of humanoids in a state of suspended animation are brought to Earth after being discovered in the hold of an alien space ship by the crew of a European Space Shuttle.

The film received negative reviews on release and was a box office failure, but has since become a cult film.

Plot
The crew of the joint British and American Space Shuttle Churchill, under the command of Colonel Tom Carlsen, finds a  spaceship hidden in the coma of Halley's Comet. Inside, the crew discovers hundreds of desiccated bat-like creatures and three naked humanoid bodies (two male and one female) in suspended animation within glass containers. The crew recovers a bat-alien and the three bodies and begins the return trip to Earth. However, during the return journey, mission control loses contact with Churchill. A rescue mission is launched to investigate.

The rescuers discover that Churchill has been gutted by fire. The present crew are dead, and the escape pod is missing, yet the three containers bearing the bodies remain intact. The bodies are taken to the European Space Research Centre in London. Prior to an autopsy, the female alien awakens and drains the life force out of a guard. She then escapes the facility and proceeds to drain other humans of their life force. The two male vampires awaken and attempt a violent escape, but they are apparently destroyed by grenades thrown by the guards. Soon after, the guard revives two hours after his death and also displays the ability to drain others of their life force.

Meanwhile, in Texas, an escape pod from Churchill is found with Carlsen inside. Carlsen is flown to London, where he describes the course of events, including feeling compelled to open the female vampire's container and share his life force with her, culminating in the draining of the Churchill crew's life force. Carlsen explains that he set fire to the shuttle with the intention of saving Earth from the same fate and escaped in the pod. However, when he is hypnotised, it becomes clear that Carlsen possesses a psychic link to the female alien, and he reveals her ability to shapeshift. Carlsen and SAS Colonel Colin Caine trace her to a psychiatric hospital in Yorkshire. The two believe they have managed to trap her within the heavily sedated body of the hospital's manager, Dr. Armstrong. Carlsen and Caine later learn they were deceived, as the aliens had wanted to draw them out of London.

The two male vampires have survived by shapeshifting into the soldiers who killed their previous bodies, and now the pair are infecting most of London's population. As Carlsen and Caine are transporting Dr. Armstrong back to London, the female alien escapes from her sedated host and disappears. Martial law is declared as the vampire plague sweeps through the city; the victims seeking out other humans to absorb their life force and perpetuate the cycle. The absorbed life forces are channeled by the male vampires to the female vampire, who transmits the accumulated energy to their spaceship, which is now in geosynchronous orbit over London.

Dr. Fallada impales one of the male vampires with an ancient weapon of "leaded iron". He contacts Carlsen and Caine and surmises that the creatures have visited Earth periodically with the coming of Halley's Comet, creating the vampire legends. He delivers the weapon to Caine before succumbing to the infection. The female vampire is tracked by Carlsen to St. Paul's Cathedral, where she is lying upon the altar, transferring energy to her spaceship. She reveals, much to Carlsen's shock, that they are a part of each other due to the sharing of their life forces, thus sharing their psychic bond. Caine follows Carlsen to the cathedral and is intercepted by the second male vampire, whom he kills. Caine throws the weapon to Carlsen, who impales himself and the female alien simultaneously. This action causes the release of a burst of energy that blows open the dome of St. Paul's. The two ascend the column of energy to the spaceship, which then returns to the comet as Caine watches.

Cast

Noted stage actor Patrick Connor played the Fatherly Guard, while Nicholas Donnelly played a Police Inspector, Julian Firth (no relation to Peter Firth) had an early role as Second Boy in Park, and Richard Oldfield played the Mission Leader.

Production

Background
Lifeforce was the first film of Tobe Hooper's three-picture deal with Cannon Films, following Poltergeist in 1982, which was a collaboration with producer Steven Spielberg. The other two films are the remake of Invaders from Mars and The Texas Chainsaw Massacre 2.

Before Hooper was finally approved, Michael Winner was offered the chance to direct the film.

It has been suggested that Lifeforce is largely a remake of Hammer Film Productions's Quatermass and the Pit. In an interview, director Tobe Hooper discussed how Cannon Films gave him $25 million, free rein, and Colin Wilson's book The Space Vampires. Hooper then shares how giddy he was: "I thought I'd go back to my roots and make a 70 mm Hammer film."

Screenplay
The screenplay was written by Dan O'Bannon and Don Jakoby (both would also collaborate with Tobe Hooper in Invaders from Mars). Hooper came up with the idea of using Halley's Comet in the screenplay, rather than the asteroid belt as originally used in the novel, as the comet was going to pass by Earth one year following the film's release. The time settings were also changed from the mid-21st century to the present day. Michael Armstrong and Olaf Pooley were brought on during production to perform uncredited rewrites, Armstrong acting as a liaison between Hooper and the art department.

Hooper later said, "The spirit of the book is certainly there from my interpretation of the reading. Though Colin Wilson's novel was set in the future, I made it a contemporary piece for identification. Also, I tied in Halley's comet, where they make the find of the alien ship. It has been millions of years in the coma of Halley's comet, traveling as a parasite of sorts. But, basically, I think the movie embodies the same spiritual feeling that Colin Wilson intended."

Colin Wilson was unhappy with the way the film turned out. He wrote of it, "John Fowles had once told me that the film of The Magus was the worst movie ever made. After seeing Lifeforce I sent him a postcard telling him that I had gone one better."

Hooper later said "Lifeforce had a great look but lacked a screenplay. There wasn't a hell of a lot that could be done  about that except to change it completely. The film started off as Space Vampires, and that's actually what it should've been called. With that title you'd look at that picture with a completely different set of sunglasses!"

Casting
In February 1984, Billy Idol said he had been offered a lead role as a vampire by Hooper, who had directed the video of "Dancing with Myself", but turned it down due to touring commitments.

In April John Gielgud said "I was recently offered an enormous sum to play in a film called Space Vampires, and I nearly fell for it because it would have been nice to have had the money. But the next time I heard from them the figure had somehow been reduced by half, so I said no".

Filming
Filming began on 2 February 1984. The film was shot in Britain. It was originally scheduled for 17 weeks. It went five weeks over. "The Cannon people were great," Railsback said. "All they told Tobe was: 'Keep going.

According to interviews with Bill Malin, who plays one of the male vampires, the film went over schedule during production. Because of this some important scenes were never shot, and the film was shut down at one time because the studio had simply run out of money.

The film marked the fourth project to feature special effects produced by Academy Award winner John Dykstra, who in 1986 was granted with the "Caixa Catalunya Award for Best Special Effects" in the Sitges Film Festival (located in Spain) for his special effects work in Lifeforce. The umbrella-like alien spaceship was modelled after an artichoke, while the model London destroyed in the film was actually the remains of Tucktonia, a model village near Christchurch, United Kingdom, that had closed not long before the shooting of the film. It took a week to film the death scene of the pathologist played by Jerome Willis, and bodycasts of Frank Finlay, Patrick Stewart and Aubrey Morris were made by make-up effects supervisor Nick Maley for their death scenes.

One effect near the end of the film involving the column of energy rising from the female alien through the top of St. Paul's Cathedral to the spacecraft was engineered by art director Tony Reading. A column of retroreflective material was placed against black velvet and a crew member blew cigar smoke into its bottom. This image was then front projected onto a translucent projection screen behind the actors to create the energy column.

Music
James Horner was first asked to write the score before Henry Mancini was brought in and produced a score consisting of 90 minutes of occasionally atonal and ambient music using the London Symphony Orchestra. Mancini had agreed to do the film based on the original concept of a 15-minute essentially dialogue-free opening sequence involving the discovery and exploration of the alien spacecraft and the moving of the three aliens back to the Churchill, for which he composed a tonal "space ballet".

For the American domestic version, Michael Kamen and James Guthrie were asked to write occasional music cues that were placed in at the last minute.

Editing and post-production
The film was originally filmed and promoted under the same title as the Colin Wilson novel. Cannon Films, which reportedly spent nearly $25 million in hopes of creating a blockbuster film, disliked The Space Vampires for sounding too much like another of the studio's typical low budget exploitation films. As a result, the title was changed to Lifeforce, referring to the spiritual energy the space vampires drain from their victims, and it was edited for its US theatrical release by TriStar Pictures into a 101-minute domestic cut that was partially re-scored by Michael Kamen, with a majority of Henry Mancini's original music remaining.

The initial cut of Lifeforce as edited by Tobe Hooper was 128 minutes long. This is 12 minutes longer than the final version which had several scenes cut, most of them taking place on the Space Shuttle Churchill. According to Nicholas Ball, who played the main British astronaut, Derebridge, it was felt that there was too much material in outer space and so the majority of the Churchill scenes were deleted. Also, most of Nicholas Ball's performance ended up on the cutting room floor according to an interview he gave on the UK talk show Wogan in 1985.

Despite being credited on the US domestic cut, the following actors were deleted from that cut of the film: John Woodnutt, John Forbes-Robertson and Russell Sommers. The Churchill commanding officer Rawlins, played by Geoffrey Frederick, was British, but in post-production it was decided that Patrick Jordan would dub his voice. Also in the US version, some of Geoffrey Frederick's voiceover heard on the Churchill is dubbed.

Reception

Box office
Lifeforce was released on 21 June 1985 to poor box office returns. The film opened in fourth place, losing a head-to-head battle against Ron Howard's science fiction film, Cocoon. The film earned $11,603,545 at the US box office.

Critical response
On release, the film received negative reviews from American critics. Janet Maslin, of The New York Times, wrote, '[I]ts style is shrill and fragmented enough to turn Lifeforce into hysterical vampire porn." Michael Wilmington, in the Los Angeles Times, wrote that the film was 'such a peculiar movie [that] it's difficult to get a handle on it'. Jay Carr wrote in The Boston Globe that 'it plays like a tap-dancing zombie'. John Clute dismissed Lifeforce as a 'deeply silly flick'. Leonard Maltin called the film 'completely crazy' and said it was 'ridiculous, but so bizarre, it's fascinating'.

On the other hand, horror and comic book writer C. J. Henderson praised the film: "Lifeforce is an incredible film, and may by be the most intelligent vampire movie ever made...[the ideas presented in Lifeforce] are beyond [other vampire movies,] beyond all of them, light-years beyond...the story is what makes this movie hum....Lifeforce is a true, thinking sci-fi fan's film". Andrew Migliore and John Strysik, in their Lurker in the Lobby, explained that Colin Wilson wrote The Space Vampires as a consequence of H.P. Lovecraft's publisher August Derleth challenging Wilson (who was critical of Lovecraft's writing) to write a Lovecraftian novel himself (a challenge that resulted in three such novels, The Mind Parasites, The Space Vampires, and The Philosopher's Stone), and they continued, "Lifeforce is big, splashy, and...the scenes of an apocalyptic London are not to be missed. And the film, an obvious tribute to Nigel Kneale's Quatermass, has deep roots in Lovecraft's mythos". Film critic Gene Siskel, of Siskel & Ebert, called the film a "guilty-pleasure", awarding it 3 out of 4 stars.

On the review aggregator website Rotten Tomatoes, Lifeforce holds a 57% approval rating based on 30 critic reviews, with an average rating of 5.6/10. The consensus reads, "Brazenly strange and uneven in its execution, Lifeforce is an otherworldly sci-fi excursion punctuated with off-kilter horror flourishes." On Metacritic, the film has a weighted average score of 50 out of 100 based on 12 critics, indicating "mixed or average reviews".

Home media
The first release on video in the UK was the heavily edited US "domestic cut". The full "international cut" was not available until it was released by MGM in the 2000s. The first US release of the "international cut" was MGM/UA's 1994 release on deluxe widescreen letterboxed LaserDisc.

Scream Factory announced they would be releasing Lifeforce in a Blu-ray/DVD Combo Pack on 18 June 2013. This included the US domestic cut, as well as the international cut of the film.

Arrow Video released Lifeforce in the UK as a steelbook two-disc Blu-ray special edition on 14 October 2013, with the same features as the US Blu-ray release.

See also
 Vampire film

Explanatory notes

Citations

General references

External links
 
 
 
 
 
 

1985 films
1985 horror films
1980s British films
1980s English-language films
1980s science fiction horror films
Alien abduction films
Alien invasions in films
British science fiction horror films
British space adventure films
British vampire films
British zombie films
Fiction about Halley's Comet
Films about extraterrestrial life
Films about shapeshifting
Films based on British novels
Films based on horror novels
Films based on science fiction novels
Films directed by Tobe Hooper
Films produced by Menahem Golan
Films produced by Yoram Globus
Films scored by Henry Mancini
Films set in the future
Films set in London
Films set in Texas
Films set in Yorkshire
Films set on spacecraft
Films shot at EMI-Elstree Studios
Films with screenplays by Dan O'Bannon
Golan-Globus films
Succubi in film
TriStar Pictures films